is a Japanese seinen manga magazine anthology published by Kodansha. Initially published bimonthly, it switched to a monthly publication schedule starting with the 25th issue in late 2012. Each issue typically has around twenty-five stories by various artists and runs about 800 pages. It is a sister magazine to Kodansha's successful monthly manga anthology Afternoon, and was first launched on November 7, 2008. Each issue sells for 680 yen. It had a circulation of 27,000 from 1 October 2018 to 30 September 2019.

Currently running manga series

Manga artists and series featured in Good! Afternoon

2000s
Tsutomu Takahashi - Jiraishin Diablo (2008–2011)
Hiroaki Wakamiya - Shūkyū Shōjo (2008–2014)
Moare Oota - Teppu (2008–2015)
Masayuki Ishikawa - Junketsu no Maria (2008–2013)
Motoi Yoshida - Natsu no Zenjitsu (2008–2014)
Asuka Katsura (art) & Isuna Hasekura (story) - Billionaire Girl (2009–2013)
Mohiro Kitoh - Nani ka mochigatte masu ka (2009–2015)

2010s
 Hiroaki Wakamiya - Loveplus Kanojo no Kakao (2010)
 Ryū Mizunagi - Witchcraft Works (2010-2022)
Eiji Karasuyama (art) & Yusuke Kishi (story) - Aku no Kyoten (2012–2015)
Gamon Sakurai - Ajin: Demi-Human (2012–2021)
Gido Amagakure - Sweetness and Lightning (2013–2018)
Kōsuke Hamada - Hanebado! (2013–2019)
Saburouta - Jūō Mujin no Fafnir (2014–2015)
 Masayuki Ishikawa -  Junketsu no Maria Exhibition (2014)
 Chiyomaru Shikura - Occultic;Nine (2015–2017)
Hiroaki Wakamiya - U12 (2015–2019)
Yoko Hano - Iron Snow (2018–2020)
Mari Mafuyu - Tettsui to Pieta (2019–2020)

2020s
 LEN [A-7] - Love Score (2020–2021)

References

External links
 
Official blog 

2008 establishments in Japan
Monthly manga magazines published in Japan
Kodansha magazines
Magazines established in 2008
Seinen manga magazines